The year 1901 in architecture involved some significant events.

Buildings and structures

Buildings

 Federal Court House and Post office for the Upper Midwest, the modern-day "Landmark Center", St. Paul, Minnesota, designed by Willoughby J. Edbrooke, is completed.
 Philadelphia City Hall in Philadelphia, Pennsylvania, designed by John McArthur, Jr., is completed, the world's tallest occupied masonry building.
 Stolp Town Hall, in modern-day Słupsk, Poland, designed by Karl Zaar with Rudolf Vahl, is opened.
 Germantown Junction station, North Philadelphia, designed by Theophilus P. Chandler Jr., is completed.
 Moscow Vindavsky railway station, designed by Stanislav Brzhozovsky, is opened.
 Union Station (Washington, D.C.), designed by Daniel Burnham and W. Pierce Anderson, is commissioned.
 Union Trust Company Building in Providence, Rhode Island, designed by Stone, Carpenter & Willson, is completed.
 Postal Savings Bank building (Postatakarékpénztár), Budapest, designed by Ödön Lechner, is completed.
 Wardenclyffe Tower in Shoreham, New York, designed by Nikola Tesla and Stanford White is begun.
 Willits House in Highland Park, Illinois, designed by Frank Lloyd Wright.
 Deanery Garden in Sonning, England, designed by Edwin Lutyens with garden by Gertrude Jekyll, is completed.
 Langer House in Vienna, designed by Jože Plečnik, is completed.
 Whitechapel Art Gallery in east London, designed by Charles Harrison Townsend, is opened.
 Horniman Museum in south London, designed by C. Harrison Townsend, is completed.
 Génin-Louis Grain Shop in Nancy, designed by Henry Gutton and his nephew Henri Gutton, is built.
 Vaxelaire Department Store in Nancy, designed by Émile André and Eugène Vallin, is completed.
 Jakarta Cathedral in the Dutch East Indies, completed by M. J. Hulswit following a design of 1891 by Pastor Antonius Dijkmans, is consecrated.
 Erlöserkirche, Munich, designed by Theodor Fischer, is consecrated.
 Zuoz Bridge, Switzerland, designed by Robert Maillart, is built.
 The Glasgow International Exhibition (1901) is held with new architecture by James Millar and Charles Rennie Mackintosh and transplanted mock Tudor cottages from Port Sunlight.

Awards
 Grand Prix de Rome, architecture: Jean Hulot

Publications
 Barry Parker and Raymond Unwin – The Art of Building a Home

Births
 January 25 – Pablo Antonio, Filipino architect (died 1975)
 February 20 – Louis Kahn, American architect (died 1974)
 April 11 – Bertalan Árkay, Hungarian architect (died 1971)
 April 12 – Thomas Sharp, English urban planner (died 1978)
 June 23 – Amyas Connell, New Zealand-born architect (died 1980)
 September 8 – Judith Ledeboer, Dutch-born English architect (died 1990)

Deaths
 James Brooks, English Gothic Revival architect (born 1825)
 May 25 – J. M. Brydon, British architect (born 1840)

References